Eysteinn Jónsson (13 November 1906 – 11 August 1993) was an Icelandic politician and former minister. He was the Minister of Finance of Iceland from 1934 to 1939 and from 1950 to 1954 and from 1954 to 1958. He served as speaker of the Althing from 1971 to 1974.

References

External links 
 Non auto-biography of Eysteinn Jónsson on the parliament website

1906 births
1993 deaths
Eysteinn Jonsson
Eysteinn Jonsson
Eysteinn Jonsson